This is a list of Munster Senior Hurling Championship winning managers.  The term manager (or coach) only came into widespread use in the 1970s.  Up until then hurling teams were usually run by selection panels.  Sometimes they contained up to ten members, resulting in self-interest coming to the fore more often than not.  All this changed with the appointment of a strong manager, surrounded by a small group of selectors.

By year

Managers
Munster